Anders Karl Gustaf Gustafsson (born 7 April 1979 in Jönköping) is a Swedish sprint canoeist who has competed since the mid-2000s. He won four medals at the ICF Canoe Sprint World Championships with a gold (K-1 500 m: 2010) and three silvers (K-1 500 m, K-1 1000 m: both 2009); K-1 1000 m: 2011.

Gustafsson also competed in four Summer Olympics, earning his best finish of fifth in the K-1 1000 m event at London in 2012.

He is currently a member of Jönköpings Kanotklubb.

Gustafsson joined Artemis Racing for their 2017 America's Cup challenge.

References

Canoe09.ca profile
Official website 

1979 births
Living people
Canoeists at the 2000 Summer Olympics
Canoeists at the 2004 Summer Olympics
Canoeists at the 2008 Summer Olympics
Canoeists at the 2012 Summer Olympics
Olympic canoeists of Sweden
Swedish male canoeists
ICF Canoe Sprint World Championships medalists in kayak
Artemis Racing sailors
2017 America's Cup sailors
2021 America's Cup sailors
American Magic
People from Jönköping
Sportspeople from Jönköping County